Raju Parmar (born 27 June 1950) is an Indian politician. He was a Member of Parliament, representing Gujarat in the Rajya Sabha the upper house of India's Parliament as a member of the Indian National Congress(INC). In August 2022, he left INC and joined Bharatiya Janata Party (BJP).

References

Rajya Sabha members from Gujarat
Indian National Congress politicians from Gujarat
1950 births
Living people
Bharatiya Janata Party  politicians from Gujarat